Henry Krumrey (February 3, 1852 – January 13, 1922) was an American farmer, businessman, and politician.

Biography
Born in Plymouth, Sheboygan County, Wisconsin, Krumrey was a farmer and livestock dealer. In 1912, he helped found the Wisconsin Cheese Production Federation. Krumrey was active in the Republican Party as a presidential elector in the United States presidential election of 1900 and a delegate to the Republican Party Convention of 1908. In Plymouth, Krumrey served as supervisor, town chairman, and treasurer. He also served on the school board as one of the directors. In 1901, Krumrey served in the Wisconsin State Assembly and then in the Wisconsin State Senate from 1909 to 1913. In 1922, Krumrey committed suicide by hanging himself at his summer cottage in Crystal Lake, Illinois.

References

1852 births
1922 suicides
People from Plymouth, Wisconsin
Businesspeople from Wisconsin
Farmers from Wisconsin
Wisconsin city council members
Mayors of places in Wisconsin
School board members in Wisconsin
Republican Party Wisconsin state senators
Suicides by hanging in Illinois
1922 deaths
Republican Party members of the Wisconsin State Assembly